Lefter Goga (6 May 1921 – 21 November 1997) was an Albanian politician. Elected deputy of the National Assembly in 1954 representing the District of Durrës, he went on to serve 7 consecutive terms until 1982. Goga became a member of the Central Committee joining in 1966 at the 5th Party Congress and on that same year was appointed to the post of the "First Secretary of the Party" in the District of Krujë. He served as Chairman of the Assembly of the Republic of Albania from 1963 – 1966, as Prosecutor General from 1966 – 1970 and later as Finance Minister from 1974 – 1976.

References

Speakers of the Parliament of Albania
Members of the Parliament of Albania
1921 births
1997 deaths
Albanian communists
Government ministers of Albania
Finance ministers of Albania
20th-century Albanian politicians
Prosecutors general of Albania